Enteromius seymouri is a species of cyprinid fish in the genus Enteromius which is endemic to Malawi.

Footnotes 

 

Enteromius
Taxa named by Denis Tweddle
Taxa named by Paul Harvey Skelton
Fish described in 2008
Fish of Lake Malawi